Gamali Felix (born 17 March 1999) is a Grenadian athlete who competes primarily in the Sprints (formerly in Long Jump and Triple Jump). While attending the Grenada Boys Secondary School he became the under 16 boys Record holder in the Long Jump as well as the under 18 boys Record holder in the Triple Jump. He secured a Silver medal representing Grenada at the 2016 Carifta games with a jump of 14.55m.

In 2017 Felix was able to set a new school record in the senior boys 400m with a time of 49.44s thus erasing the old mark of 50.30s set by Anthony Modeste in 1993. This was Felix's first year competing in the event. At the National Junior Championships of the same year Felix extended his personal best distance in the Triple Jump with a jump of 14.87m.

In 2021 Felix became the NJCAA National Indoor Champion in the men's 400m. He was the first Grenadian athlete to win this title. 
He also earned All-American honors as part of the Barton County Community  team which finish third at the outdoor Championships.

He represented Grenada at the 2021 Junior Pan American Games and placed fourth in the Men's 400m.

Competition record
All information taken from World Athletics profile.

References

External links
 
 Arizona State Sun Devils bio

1999 births
Living people
Grenadian triple jumpers
Grenadian long jumpers
Grenadian male sprinters
Arizona State Sun Devils men's track and field athletes
Barton Cougars men's track and field athletes
People from St. George's, Grenada